Ilya Vladyslavovych Blyznyuk (born 28 July 1973 is a Ukrainian football coach and former goalkeeper.

Personal life 
Blyznyuk is the father of 3 children, including 2012 Olympics and 2016 Olympics champion in group rhythmic gymnastics Anastasia Bliznyuk.

External links
Brief info at www.ukrainiansoccer.net

1973 births
Living people
Footballers from Zaporizhzhia
Ukrainian footballers
Ukrainian expatriate footballers
Expatriate footballers in Russia
Ukrainian expatriate sportspeople in Russia
Ukrainian football managers
Ukraine international footballers
FC Metalurh Zaporizhzhia players
FC Dynamo Kyiv players
FC Dynamo-2 Kyiv players
FC Dynamo-3 Kyiv players
FC Zirka Kropyvnytskyi players
FC Kryvbas Kryvyi Rih players
FC Dnipro players
FC Rostov players
FC Spartak Vladikavkaz players
FC Tom Tomsk players
FC Shinnik Yaroslavl players
Russian Premier League players
Ukrainian Premier League players
Ukrainian Premier League managers
FC Mariupol managers
FC Zirka Kropyvnytskyi managers
FC Poltava managers
FC Metalurh Zaporizhzhia managers
FC Yednist Plysky managers
Association football goalkeepers
PFC Sumy managers
MFC Mykolaiv managers